Yuan Bingyan  (born 17 January 1992) is a Chinese actress.

Career
Yuan Bingyan debuted with a supporting role in the wuxia drama Ip Man. She also played a role in the popular sitcom iPartment 4. Yuan then played supporting roles in historical drama The Last Emperor and wuxia drama  Legend of Zu Mountain.

Yuan played her first lead role in the campus web drama Campus Belle and Beau and gained attention for her performance.

Yuan became known to the wider audience after starring in the action adventure drama The Mystic Nine as Ya Tou. The same year, she starred in the wuxia drama The Legend of Flying Daggers.

In 2018, Yuan starred in the fantasy historical drama Ever Night as the second female lead, Mo Shanshan. Yuan's portrayal won acclaim from viewers, and led to a rise in popularity for the actress. The same year, she played the female lead in the historical romance drama Royal Highness alongside Jiang Jinfu.

In 2019, Yuan starred in the wuxia drama Listening Snow Tower alongside Qin Junjie.

In 2020, Yuan starred in the xianxia romance drama Love and Redemption.

On 13 June 2022, Yuan Bingyan’s affiliated company, Chongqing Liyan Culture Media Co., Ltd., was fined 978,000 yuan for tax evasion from 2019–2021. On July 3, Yuan Bingyan resigned from the position of legal representative, executive director and manager of the company. She previously held 100% of the company's shares before withdrawing from all of her positions.

Filmography

Film

Television series

Discography

Awards

References

1992 births
Living people
Actresses from Shanghai
Shanghai Theatre Academy alumni
21st-century Chinese actresses
Chinese television actresses
Chinese film actresses